Trigynaspida is a suborder of mites in the order Mesostigmata. There are more than 25 families and at least 90 described species in Trigynaspida.

Families
These 27 families belong to the suborder Trigynaspida:

 Aenictequidae Kethley, 1977
 Antennophoridae Berlese, 1892
 Asternoseiidae Vale, 1954
 Celaenopsidae Berlese, 1892
 Cercomegistidae Trägårdh, 1937
 Costacaridae Hunter, 1993
 Davacaridae Kethley, 1977
 Diplogyniidae Trägårdh, 1941
 Euphysalozerconidae Kim, 2008
 Euzerconidae Trägårdh, 1938
 Fedrizziidae Trägårdh, 1937
 Hoplomegistidae Camin & Gorirossi, 1955
 Klinckowstroemiidae Camin & Gorirossi, 1955
 Megacelaenopsidae Funk, 1975
 Megisthanidae Berlese, 1914
 Messoracaridae Kethley, 1977
 Neotenogyniidae Kethley, 1974
 Paramegistidae Trägårdh, 1946
 Parantennulidae Willmann, 1941
 Philodanidae Kethley, 1977
 Promegistidae Kethley, 1977
 Ptochacaridae Kethley, 1977
 Pyrosejidae Lindquist & Moraza, 1993
 Saltiseiidae Walter, 2000
 Schizogyniidae Trägårdh, 1950
 Seiodidae Kethley, 1977
 Triplogyniidae Funk, 1977

References

Further reading

 

Acari